Malé Ludince is a village and municipality in the Levice District in the Nitra Region of Slovakia.

History
In historical records the village was first mentioned in 1293.

Geography
The village lies at an altitude of 136 metres and covers an area of 6.803 km². It has a population of about 205 people.

Ethnicity
The village is approximately 83% Magyar and 17% Slovak.

Facilities
The village has a public corner shop, public nursery and a football pitch.

External links
https://web.archive.org/web/20070513023228/http://www.statistics.sk/mosmis/eng/run.html

Villages and municipalities in Levice District